Quintus Mucius Scaevola "Pontifex" (140–82 BC) was a politician of the Roman Republic and an important early authority on Roman law. He is credited with founding the study of law as a systematic discipline.  He was elected Pontifex Maximus (chief priest of Rome), as had been his father and uncle before him. He was the first Roman Pontifex Maximus to be murdered publicly, in Rome in the temple of the Vestal Virgins, signifying a breakdown of historical norms and religious taboos in the Republic.

Political career
Scaevola was elected tribune in 106 BC, aedile in 104 and consul in 95. As consul, together with his relative Lucius Licinius Crassus, he had a law (the Lex Licinia Mucia) passed in the Senate that denied Roman citizenship to certain groups within the Roman sphere of influence  ("Italians" and "Latins"). The passage of this law was one of the major contributing factors to the Social War.

Scaevola was next made governor of Asia, a position in which he became renowned for his harsh treatment of corrupt tax collectors, and for publishing an edict that later became a standard model for provincial administration. Cicero, for instance, modelled his governor's edict for Cilicia on Scaevola's example. Scaevola's honest administration was so successful that the people he governed instituted a festival day (the dies Mucia) in his honour. This festival was in turn so popular that even Mithridates VI of Pontus left it untouched when he invaded Asia in the First Mithridatic War.

However, by governing Asia so fairly, Scaevola and his legate Publius Rutilius Rufus attracted the enmity of the Equites, who were being denied their usual profits from extorting the locals. These equestrian businessmen later conspired to have Rutilius Rufus prosecuted and exiled for the charge of extortion in 92 BC, a trial that became a byword for injustice to later generations of Romans. 

Returning to Rome, Scaevola was elected pontifex maximus. He took the opportunity to regulate more strictly the priestly colleges and to ensure that traditional rituals were properly observed.

Scaevola was the author of a treatise on civil law (Jus civile primus constituit generatim in libros decem et octo redigendo) that spanned eighteen volumes, compiling and systematising legislation and precedents. He also wrote a short legal handbook (ο̉ροι, or simply Liber Singularis) containing a glossary of terms and an outline of basic principles. Four short sections of this latter work were incorporated by Justinian I into his Pandectae, but nothing of the rest of his works is extant today. Speeches by Scaevola extant in ancient times were praised by Cicero.

He was also the originator of cautelary law giving his name to the cautio muciana and the praesumptio muciana.

Death
Scaevola was killed in the civil unrest surrounding the power struggle between Sulla and Gaius Marius. At the latter's funeral in 86 BC, an attempt was made on his life at the instigation of Flavius Fimbria, one of Marius's most violent partisans, who, upon hearing that the victim survived, albeit with a severe wound, launched a prosecution against him, on the grounds that the priest had not allowed the blade to be fully thrust onto his body. Scaevola's loyalty to the Marian party was sufficiently in doubt that, in 82, Marius's son ordered the praetor in Rome, Damasippus, to convene the Senate on some pretext in order to murder Scaevola and other unreliable senators in the senate house. Once Scaevola realized the ploy, he fled to the temple of Vesta where, at the vestibule, he was killed by assassins. His corpse was thrown unburied into the Tiber.

Family
Scaevola was the son of Publius Mucius Scaevola, who was consul in 133 BC and also Pontifex Maximus.

Scaevola was married twice, both women were named Licinia. He divorced his first wife, who was noted for her beauty, for adultery with another ex-consul. This marriage had a daughter Mucia Tertia; she was married to Pompey the Great, with whom she had his three surviving children.  By his granddaughter Pompeia (wife of Faustus Cornelius Sulla, eldest surviving son of the Dictator), Scaevola had descendants living well into the first and possibly second century of this era.

See also
 Mucia gens
 College of Pontiffs

References

140 BC births
82 BC deaths
2nd-century BC Romans
1st-century BC clergy
1st-century BC Roman consuls
Ancient Roman jurists
Ancient Roman murder victims
Ancient Roman rhetoricians
Scaevola Pontifex, Quintus
Pontifices maximi of the Roman Republic
Roman governors of Asia